Achyra nudalis is a moth of the family Crambidae. It was described by Jacob Hübner in 1796. It is found from southern Europe east to India and Mongolia. It has also been recorded from Yemen, Niger, Saudi Arabia and South Africa.

References

Moths described in 1796
Moths of Europe
Moths of Asia
Lepidoptera of West Africa
Moths of the Middle East
Moths of Africa
Pyraustinae
Taxa named by Jacob Hübner